Canthigaster punctata is a species of pufferfish in the family Tetraodontidae. It is a tropical marine species known only from the Mascarene Submarine Ridge in the Indian Ocean. It is reportedly oviparous.

References 

punctata
Taxa named by Keiichi Matsuura
Fish described in 1992
Fish of the Indian Ocean